Thomas of Britain (also known as Thomas of England) was a poet of the 12th century. He is known for his Old French poem Tristan, a version of the Tristan and Iseult legend that exists only in eight fragments, amounting to around 3,300 lines of verse, mostly from the latter part of the story. It is calculated that this represents about one sixth of the original.

Works
Because Thomas has an "obvious dependence" on Wace's 1155 Roman de Brut, Tristan was written between 1155 and 1160, possibly for Eleanor of Aquitaine, since the work suggests close ties with the court of Henry II. Beyond this, his identity is obscure; it has been speculated that he is to be identified with the "Thomas" who wrote the Romance of Horn, but this is unsupported. It is similar to the Tristan-story Chevrefoil by Marie de France, but either author could have borrowed from the other, or both from a third source.

Although Thomas's own text is fragmentary, later adaptations of his work make it possible to reconstruct what is missing:
 Gottfried von Strassburg's Tristan (Middle High German), left incomplete c. 1210, though fortuitously it covers all those parts of Thomas's work which are lost. Gottfried expanded the story by about a third, while nonetheless remaining fairly faithful to Thomas.
 Brother Robert's Old Norse Tristrams saga ok Ísöndar (Saga of Tristram and Isond), written in 1226 (prose), condensing the story.
 The Middle English Sir Tristrem (verse, late 13th Century), a much abbreviated retelling.
 The Italian La Tavola Ritonda (prose, 14th century).

Thomas' version is the earliest known representative of the "courtly branch" of the legend, to which Gottfried's also belongs. This branch differs from the "common" or "primitive" versions of Béroul and Eilhart von Oberge, in that greater emphasis is placed on pleasing the sensibilities and expectations of a courtly audience. Some scholars have theorized an "Ur-Tristan", an original French version that inspired all later accounts. Joseph Bédier attempted to reconstruct this original from the evidence provided by the later versions.

See also

Anglo-Norman literature

References

Editions and translations
Thomas, Les fragments du Roman de Tristan, ed. Bartina H. Wind, Paris/Geneva 1960.
Gottfried von Strassburg, Tristan, with the suriviving fragments of the Tristran of Thomas, translated A.T. Hatto, Penguin, 1960.
The Saga of Tristram and Ísönd, translated with an introduction by Paul Schach, University of Nebraska Press 1973.

External links
Tristan of Thomas of Britain in French Wikisource.
Complete text of three fragments
Text of three fragments and modern French translation
The Carlisle Fragment of Thomas's Tristan, translated J. Shoaf
Text of 6 fragments
The Romance of Tristan & Iseult Drawn from the best French Sources and Retold by J. Bédier Rendered into English by H. Belloc at Project Gutenberg.

Anglo-Norman literature
Writers of Arthurian literature
British poets
British writers in French
12th-century French writers
12th-century poets
Norman-language poets
British male poets
Tristan and Iseult